Regina D. Lewis-Ward (born October 4, 1959) is an American politician and children's book author from Georgia. Lewis-Ward is a Democrat member of the Georgia House of Representatives from District 109. A native of Brooklyn, New York, Lewis-Ward grew up in New York City Housing Authority and attend public schools.

Representative Lewis-Ward entered public office in 2014 as a councilwoman in Stockbridge, GA advocating for inclusive communities, becoming the first politician from Stockbridge to respond to segregated playgrounds. Lewis-Ward's commitment to unite families and children of all abilities led to inclusive play at Stockbridge Memorial and Clark Parks with adaptive playground equipment. Lewis-Ward started the first Stockbridge Citizens Academy to offer citizen engagement with their local government. In 2016, Lewis-Ward made a run for Mayor of Stockbridge. From a field of four candidates, she received the most votes in the history of Stockbridge municipal elections (38.9% or 3,760 votes). She lost the run-off election by 142 votes to Judy B Neal.

As the 2018 and 2020 Democratic nominee for Georgia State House, District 109, Lewis-Ward became the first African American woman to receive the nomination by a major U.S. political party. Her 2020 victory against Republican Dale Rutledge marked a historic win as the only African American woman in the United States to unseat a male Republican incumbent during the 2020 elections. During her first session as a lawmaker, Representative Lewis-Ward co-authored, HB 676 bipartisan legislation, that was signed into law, effective May 4, 2021.

Fair Fight Action appointed Representative Lewis-Ward as a senior fellow to promote fair elections, encourage participation, and educate voters about elections and voting rights. Lewis-Ward is the chairwoman of the Democratic Party of Georgia Henry County Committee and serves on the state of Georgia Agriculture & Consumer Affairs, Banks & Banking, and Interstate Cooperation committees.

Representative Lewis-Ward earned a Bachelor of Business Administration in computer systems, from Bernard M. Baruch College, New York, and a Master of Art, in political science, from Clayton State University, Georgia. She wrote her graduate thesis on the United States Federal Government and Lags in Protecting Personally Identifiable Information.  Lewis-Ward is a political science adjunct professor, who has taught Political Thought, Public Administration, & Intro to Government and Politics to students at Rasmussen College and Georgia Military College.

References

External links 
 Regina Lewis-Ward at ballotpedia.org

Democratic Party members of the Georgia House of Representatives
21st-century American politicians
Living people
21st-century American women politicians
Women state legislators in Georgia (U.S. state)
1959 births